Deharkuchi  is a village of Nalbari district in Western Assam under 11 No. Deharkuchi Gram Panchayat of Borigog Banbhag Development Block. This village is located 14 km towards east from Nalbari district headquarters.

Language
The primary language used in Deharkuchi is Kamrupi, as in Nalbari district and Kamrup region.

Education
There is a lower primary school in Deharkuchi named Deharkuchi L.P. School

See also
 Villages of Nalbari District

References

External links
 

Villages in Nalbari district